Mbarek Zarrougui (born 19 May 1954) is a Moroccan Olympic boxer. He represented his country in the flyweight division at the 1976 Summer Olympics. He lost his first match against Vicente Rodríguez.

1976 Olympic results
Below is the record of Mbarek Zarrougui, a Moroccan flyweight boxer who competed at the 1976 Montreal Olympics:
 
 Round of 64: bye
 Round of 32: lost to Vicente Rodríguez (Spain) referee stopped contest in the second round

References

1954 births
Living people
Moroccan male boxers
Olympic boxers of Morocco
Boxers at the 1976 Summer Olympics
Flyweight boxers